Conchocarpus elegans is a tree species in the genus Conchocarpus found in South-East Brazil (Rio de Janeiro).

References

External links 

 Conchocarpus elegans at The Plant List (retrieved 2 April 2016)
 Picture of holotype (Galipea elegans A.St.-Hil.) at Museum National d'Histoire Naturelle (Paris) (retrieved 2 April 2016)

Zanthoxyloideae
Plants described in 1998
Trees of Brazil
Flora of Rio de Janeiro (state)